Stabat Mater is a 13th-century Catholic hymn to Mary's suffering as Jesus Christ's mother at his crucifixion.

Stabat Mater may also refer to:

 Stabat Mater (art), artistic representations of that scene
 Stabat Mater Speciosa, about the Nativity
 Stabat Mater (Kristeva), an essay by Julia Kristeva
 Stabat Mater (ballet), a ballet by Peter Martins
 Stabat Mater (band), in the funeral doom genre

See also
 Stata Mater, an ancient Roman goddess